Traffic Police of NAJA (Polis-e Râhnamâii vâ Rânandegi-ye Naja), abbreviated as RAHVAR (Rahvâr), is a Law enforcement agency in Iran responsible for traffic guard and highway patrol.

Equipment

Cars 
 Mercedes-Benz C 240
 Mercedes-Benz E 240
 Toyota Land Cruiser 100 Series
 Toyota RAV4 XA40
 Nissan Xterra N50
 Hyundai Sonata LF Hybrid
 Kia Forte TD
 Nissan Maxima
 Renault Mégane
 Mitsubishi Pajero
 Samand
 Dena Plus
 Hyundai Santa Fe DM
 Nissan Teana
 Suzuki Grand Vitara
 Toyota Corolla E180
 Peugeot 206
 Mazda 3 BL
 Hyundai Veracruz
 Citroën Xantia
 Peugeot 407

References

External links 
  Iranian Traffic police

Specialist law enforcement agencies of Iran
Law Enforcement Command of Islamic Republic of Iran